Widjaja is a common Indonesian surname. It is one of the most common surnames in Indonesia. It may refer to

Angelique Widjaja (born 1984), Indonesian tennis player 
Eka Tjipta Widjaja (1922–2019), Indonesian entrepreneur
Elizabeth A. Widjaja (born 1951), Indonesian botanist
Fuganto Widjaja, Indonesian billionaire
Gloria Emanuelle Widjaja (born 1993), Indonesian badminton player
Mieke Widjaja or Mieke Wijaya (born 1940), Indonesian actress
Mira Widjaja (born 1951), Indonesian author
Nani Widjaja (born 1943), Indonesian actress

See also
(黄) Widjaja
Jaja (disambiguation)
WJJA (disambiguation)

Indonesian-language surnames